Bakhtiyaar Irani (born 19 November 1979) is an Indian film and television actor who has participated in Indian television reality shows. He has appeared in the reality dance series Nach Baliye, paired with his wife Tannaz Irani. In 2009, the couple became participants in Bigg Boss.

Early life
Bhakhtiyar Irani was born in Mumbai. He was educated at Rutgers University

Career
Bhakhtiyar Irani surprised everyone as he turned out to be the surprise package on the popular dance show Nach Baliye in which he participated with his wife Tannaz Irani. Subsequently, he participated in another reality dance series, Zara Nachke Dikha (2008). He was a contestant on the show Zor Ka Jhatka: Total Wipeout. In the same year, he appeared in the Himesh Reshammiya and Urmila Matondkar-starrer, Karzzzz (2008), playing Dr. Dayal, played by Jalal Agha in the original. He also appeared as an extra dancer in the song "Koi Mil Gaya" in Kuch Kuch Hota Hai (wearing a yellow shirt behind Shahrukh Khan). He, along with his wife Tanaaz Irani both have their Dance Academy TEE & BEE in Dubai.<ref>Tanaaz and Bakhtiyaar Dance Institute Official Website .</ref> He also appeared in a number of reality dance shows broadcast on Doordarshan National Channel.

He has also been seen in Bigg Boss 6 in a short guest appearance.

He worked with his sister Delnaaz in Yes Boss, where he played on-screen brother to his off-screen sister. He was a student of St. Mary High School S.S.C, Mumbai.

Television
 Batliwala House No. 43 as Shah Rukh Batliwala
 Lo Ho Gayi Pooja Iss Ghar Ki as Shiv Raj Khosla
Yes Boss (TV series) as
 Badi Door Se Aaye Hain as Ronnie D'Souza
 Maa Exchange as himself
 Nach Baliye as Contestant (3rd position with wife Tanaaz Irani)
 Love Kaa Tadka as Vicky
 Welcome - Baazi Mehmaan-Nawaazi Ki as himself
 Miley Jab Hum Tum Bigg Boss 3 as Contestant (Evicted on Day 79)
 Nach Baliye - Shriman Vs Shrimati as Contestant
 Zaban Sambhal Ke as Parzim
 Krazzy Kia Re as Judge
 Wagle Ki Duniya – Nayi Peedhi Naye Kissey''

See also 
List of Indian film actors

References

External links
 

Living people
Male actors in Hindi cinema
Indian male television actors
Participants in Indian reality television series
Male actors from Mumbai
Irani people
1979 births
Bigg Boss (Hindi TV series) contestants